Hatun Urqu (Quechua hatun big, urqu, mountain, "big mountain", Hispanicized spelling Ccatunorcco) is a mountain in the Cusco Region in Peru, about  high. It is situated in the Chumbivilcas Province, Velille District, south-east of Velille.

References 

Mountains of Peru
Mountains of Cusco Region